The Dhallywood film industry released 11 feature films in 1965.



See also

 1965 in Pakistan

Notes
There are numerous minor inconsistencies in transliteration among the sources. Greater discrepancies are as follows:

References

Footnotes

Bibliography

External links 
 Bangladeshi films on Internet Movie Database

Film
Bangladesh
Lists of Pakistani Bengali films by year